Carmodymyia is a genus of parasitic flies in the family Tachinidae.

Species
Carmodymyia ancylostomiae Thompson, 1963

Distribution
Trinidad and Tobago.

References

Diptera of North America
Monotypic Brachycera genera
Dexiinae
Tachinidae genera
Insects of Trinidad and Tobago